The 2022 European Rowing U23 Championships took place in Hazewinkel, Belgium from 3–4 September 2022.

Medal table

Medalists

Men

Women

References

External links 
World Rowing

European Rowing U23 Championships
Rowing competitions in Belgium
2022 in rowing
Rowing
Rowing